The Emergency Broadcast System (EBS), sometimes called the Emergency Broadcasting System or the Emergency Action Notification System (EANS), was an emergency warning system used in the United States. It replaced the previous CONELRAD system and was used from 1963 to 1997, at which point it was replaced by the Emergency Alert System.

Purpose
The system was established to provide the President of the United States with an expeditious method of communicating with the American public in the event of war, threat of war, or grave national crisis. The Emergency Broadcast System replaced CONELRAD on August 5, 1963. In later years, it was expanded for use during peacetime emergencies at the state and local levels.

Although the system was never used for a national emergency, it was activated more than 20,000 times  between 1976 and 1996 to broadcast civil emergency messages and warnings of severe weather hazards.

National Level EBS 
An order to activate the EBS at the national level would have originated with the President and been relayed via the White House Communications Agency duty officer to one of two origination points – either the Aerospace Defense Command (ADC) or the Federal Preparedness Agency (FPA) – as the system stood in 1978. Participating telecommunications common carriers, radio and television networks, the Associated Press, and United Press International would receive and authenticate (by means of code words) an Emergency Action Notification (EAN) via an EAN teletypewriter network designed specifically for this purpose. These recipients would relay the EAN to their subscribers and affiliates.

The release of the EAN by the Aerospace Defense Command or the Federal Preparedness Agency would initiate a process by which the common carriers would link otherwise independent networks such as ABC, CBS, and NBC into a single national network from which even independent stations could receive programming. "Broadcast stations would have used the 2-tone Attention Signal on their assigned broadcast frequency to alert other broadcast stations to stand by for a message from the President." The transmission of programming on a broadcast station's assigned frequency, and the fact that television networks/stations and FM radio stations could participate, distinguished EBS from CONELRAD. EBS radio stations would not necessarily transmit on 640 or 1240 on the AM dial, and FM radio and television would carry the same audio program as AM radio stations did.

Activation procedure
The Attention Signal most commonly associated with the system was a combination of the sine waves of 853 and 960 Hzsuited to attention due to its unpleasantness. Decoders at relay stations would sound an alarm, alerting station personnel to the incoming message. Then, each relay station would broadcast the alert tone and rebroadcast the emergency message from the primary station. The Attention Signal was developed in the mid-1960s.

A nationwide activation of the EBS was called an Emergency Action Notification (EAN), and was the only activation that stations were not allowed to ignore; the Federal Communications Commission made local civil emergencies,  weather advisories optional (except for stations that agreed to be the "primary" source of such messages).

To activate the EAN protocol, the Associated Press and United Press International wire services would notify stations with a special message. It began with a full line of X's, and a bell inside the Teletype machine would sound ten times. To avoid abuse and mistakes, the message included a confirmation password which changed daily. Stations that subscribed to one of the wire services were not required to activate the EBS if the activation message did not have proper confirmation.

False alarm of 1971
A properly authenticated Emergency Action Notification was incorrectly sent to United States broadcast stations at 9:33 a.m. Eastern Standard Time on February 20, 1971.
At the usual time a weekly EAN test was performed, teletype operator W.S. Eberhart had three tapes in front of him: a test tape, and two tapes indicating a real emergency, instructing the use of EAN Message #1, and #2, respectively. He inadvertently used the wrong tape, which used an incorrect codeword, "HATEFULNESS". The message ordered stations to cease regular programming immediately, and begin an Emergency Action Notification using Message #1. Message 1 stated that regular programming had been interrupted at the request of the United States government, but was not specific about the cause. A cancellation message was sent at 9:59 a.m. EST, but it used  the same codeword as the original message. A cancellation message with the correct codeword was not sent until 10:13 a.m. EST. After 40 minutes and six incorrect or improperly formatted cancellation messages, the accidental activation was officially terminated.

This false alarm demonstrated major flaws in the practical implementation of an EAN. Many stations didn't receive the alert but more importantly, those that did either ignored it (convinced it was false because it came at the time of a scheduled test), canceled the EAN prematurely with or without any coded indication that the alert was erroneous, or didn't have EAN procedure documents readily accessible to them, so they had no indication of what to do. It is estimated that only 20% of the stations that received the activation followed the procedures completely. Several stations went off the air, as they were instructed to do. Recordings from stations that did not (and are not supposed to according to EAN procedures) include one from WOWO in Fort Wayne, Indiana, for which a recording of the EAN activation exists.

This false alarm was sufficiently disruptive to move the FCC to temporarily suspend the use and testing of Emergency Action Notifications (EANs) by codeword effective February 25, 1971. In the meantime, a national EBS activation (actual or test) would be routed through news service broadcast desks, then authenticated with the White House communications center, introducing a delay of approximately one minute. Numerous investigations were launched and several changes were made to the EBS. Among them, EAN Message #2, which contains specific language indicating an imminent attack, was eliminated. Another change was moving the tapes for genuine alerts away from the broadcasting machines to prevent them from being mistaken for the weekly test tapes. After numerous safeguards were put in place, the FCC voted to resume automatic national activation of the EBS using EANs in mid-December 1972, almost 20 months after they were suspended.

Seven years later in 1978, Phoenix-area radio station, KRFM (now KYOT) mistakenly activated the EBS white card script for a few seconds interrupting the station's identification.

System uses 

Though it was never used, the FCC's EBS plan involved detailed procedures for stations to follow during an EAN. It included precise scripts that announcers were to read at the outset of the emergency, as well as whenever detailed information was scarce. Among other things, citizens were instructed not to use the telephone, but rather continue listening to broadcast stations for information.

The initial scripted announcement was: "We interrupt this program. This is a national emergency. The President of the United States or his designated representative will appear shortly over the Emergency Broadcast System."

As official information began to emerge from various sources, non-primary stations were to broadcast it according to the following priority list:
 Messages from the President of the United States
 Statewide emergency information
 Local emergency information (for a station's operational area, i.e. evacuation and sheltering plans, and severe weather)
 National programming and news (other than a presidential message)

A presidential message was always required to be aired live during an EAN. For other information, stations were to follow the priority list to decide what should be disseminated first. Lower priority official programming - such as an address by a State Governor - was to be recorded for the earliest available rebroadcast unless it were to be an 'unusually long' message, in that case it would be carried live.

Participation in EAN emergency broadcasting was done with the "voluntary cooperation" of each station (as noted in the classic test announcement). Stations that were not prepared to be part of the national EBS network were classified as "non-participating" by the FCC. During an EAN, a non-participating station was required to advise listeners/viewers to tune elsewhere to find emergency bulletins. The station's transmitter would then be turned off. Non-participating stations had to remain off the air until the EAN was terminated. Under no circumstances could any broadcast station continue with normal programming during a national emergency.

Testing the system
Until the system was suspended, radio and television stations were required to perform a Weekly Transmission Test of the Attention Signal and Test Script randomly between 8:30 a.m. and local sunset. Stations were required to perform the test at least once a week, and were only exempt from doing so if they had activated the EBS for a state or local emergency, or participated in a coordinated state or local EBS test, during the past week. Additionally, stations were required to log tests they received from each station they monitored for EBS messages. This served as an additional check, as these stations could expect to hear a weekly test from each source. Failure to receive a signal at least once a week meant that either the monitored station was having a problem transmitting the alert signal, or the monitoring station was having a problem receiving it.

Original plan
Early on, tests and activations were initiated in a similar way to CONELRAD tests. Primary stations would turn their transmitters off for five seconds, back on for five seconds, off for five seconds more, then go back on air and transmit a 1000 Hz tone for 15 seconds to alert secondary stations. Television stations adhered to similar rules, but switched only their sound carriers off. This quick off-and-on became known to broadcast engineers as the "EBS Stress Test", as older transmitters would sometimes fail after the quick cycling on and off. This became unnecessary as broadcast technology advanced and the two-tone alarm was developed.

Later test pattern
Beginning in 1976, the old CONELRAD signaling method (the "EBS Stress Test") was scrapped in favor of the following procedure:

First, normal programming was suspended, though tests were typically conducted during commercial breaks for continuity reasons. Television stations would transmit a video slide such as the two listed above; numerous designs were available over the years. Some stations even had multiple slides that they used for their tests in rotation, one for the  opening announcement, another for the attention signal transmission, and  another for the  closing announcement. One of the following announcements was transmitted:

"This is a test. For the next sixty (or thirty) seconds, this station will conduct a test of the Emergency Broadcast System. This is only a test."
"(name of host station in a particular market) is conducting a test of the Emergency Broadcast System. This is only a test." (mainly radio stations used this particular announcement)
"This is a test. (Name of Host Station) is conducting a test of the Emergency Broadcast System. This is only a test."
"This is a test. This station is conducting a test of the Emergency Broadcast System. This is only a test."
"This is a test of the Emergency Broadcast System. This is only a test."
"The following is a test of the Emergency Broadcast System."
"This is a test of the Emergency Broadcast System. Important information will follow this tone."

Alternatively, the name "Emergency Broadcasting System" could be used.

Next, the Attention Signal was transmitted from the EBS encoder for 20 to 25 seconds. In mid-1995, a new rule was put in place that gave stations the option to transmit the attention signal for anywhere from eight to 25 seconds. Noncommercial educational FM radio stations operating at 10 watts or less and low-powered TV stations were exempt from transmitting the Attention Signal.

Third, another announcement was transmitted following the attention signal. The first part read either:
"This is a test of the Emergency Broadcast System. The broadcasters of your area in voluntary cooperation with the FCC and other authorities (or, in later years, "federal, state and local authorities") have developed this system to keep you informed in the event of an emergency."
"This is a test of the Emergency Broadcast System. Broadcasters, in cooperation with the FCC and other authorities (or, in later years, "federal, state and local authorities") have developed this system to keep you informed in the event of an emergency."

There were several variations for the second half of the statement. During the system's early days, stations other than the designated primary station for an operational area were required to shut down in the event of an emergency (reminiscent of the CONELRAD days), and the message was a variation of:
"If this had been an actual emergency, you would have been instructed to tune in to one of the broadcast stations in your area."
"If this had been an actual emergency, you would have been instructed where to tune in your area for news and official information."

By the early 1980s, it had become easier for stations to record and relay messages from a primary station, and the risk of hostile bombers using broadcast signals to navigate lessened due to the development of ICBMs, as well as more capable on-board navigation systems for manned aircraft. As a result, the requirement for non-primary stations to shut down during an activation of the system was dropped, and the message became:
"If this had been an actual emergency, the Attention Signal you just heard would have been followed by official information, news, or instructions."

Stations could also list emergencies that the EBS would potentially be activated for (i.e. tornado warnings, flash flood warnings, hurricane warnings and/or earthquakes); at least one station, WXYZ-TV, infamously made explicit reference to an attack on the United States as being a possible scenario for an EBS activation in its test script.
In the late 1980s and early 90s, several television stations in the Los Angeles area had specific test scripts that emphasized earthquake preparedness. People living in the Los Angeles area were urged to study an emergency preparedness section in their telephone directories to be prepared for an earthquake or other types of emergencies.

As the EBS was about to be replaced by its successor, the afore-mentioned Emergency Alert System in the mid-1990s, some stations used the following message:
"This station is testing its Emergency Broadcast System equipment. The EBS will soon be replaced with the Emergency Alert System; the EAS will provide timely emergency warnings."

Lastly, the test concluded with one of these phrases:
"(Name of Host  station) serves (the name of operational area). This concludes this test of the Emergency Broadcast System." 
"Stations of the (name of the station public broadcasting network, for example: South Dakota Public Broadcasting Network) serve all operational areas in (name of state). This concludes this test of the Emergency Broadcast System. (used mostly by statewide public television and/or radio networks)
"This station serves the (name of operational area). This concludes this test of the Emergency Broadcast System."
"This station serves (the name of operational area). This concludes this Emergency Broadcast System Test."
"This concludes this test of the Emergency Broadcast System serving the (name of operational area)."
"This concludes this test of the Emergency Broadcast System on (name of station)."

These variations were heard in different parts of the country throughout the years depending on FCC regulations at the time, local preferences, and whether the specific station performing the test was a primary EBS station or not. The announcement text was mandated by the FCC. Stations had the option of either reading the test script live, or using recorded versions. WHEN radio in Syracuse, New York and WGR radio in Buffalo, New York both had a sung version of the most common script. There was also a version done by Los Angeles-based Cheap Radio Thrills, as well as another by the comedy team of Bob and Ray. The FCC declared it illegal to sing the test message, or read it as a joke. However, it was acceptable to read it in another language (for example, French or Spanish), if a station broadcast in a language other than English, as was done on KWEX-TV in San Antonio, Texas. Copies of the warning message script had a note saying that it was acceptable to broadcast in any other language, so long as it was broadcast in English as well.

Additionally, for a time during the 1980s, WFSB in Hartford, Connecticut had a woman appearing onscreen to deliver the opening and closing test announcements by using sign language (for the deaf people across the Hartford television market), accompanied by a male announcer reading both announcements as they were displayed on screen.

Purpose of the test and cultural impact
The purpose of the test was to allow the FCC and broadcasters to verify that EBS tone transmitters and decoders were functioning properly. In addition to the weekly test, test activations of the entire system were conducted periodically for many years. These tests showed that about 80% of broadcast outlets nationwide would carry emergency programming within a period of five minutes when the system was activated.

The weekly broadcasts of the EBS attention signal and test script made it a significant part of the American cultural fabric of its time, and became the subject of a great number of jokes and skits, such as the sung versions of the test script in the late 1970s. In addition, many people have testified to being frightened by the test patterns and attention signal as children, and even more so by actual emergencies.

Criticism
Although intended for the President to communicate with the American people in the event of a national emergency, many critics questioned whether the EBS would work in an actual emergency scenario. Curt Beckmann of WCCO-AM expressed his doubts about the system's effectiveness in a 1984 interview:

See also

CONELRAD (United States)
Emergency Alert System (United States)
Local Access Alert (United States)
Alert Ready (Canada)
Emergency Public Warning System (Alberta, Canada)
Alberta Emergency Alert (Alberta, Canada)
Four-minute warning (United Kingdom)
HANDEL (United Kingdom)
Wartime Broadcasting Service (United Kingdom)
Public Warning System (Singapore)
J-Alert (Japan)

References

Further reading

External links
 What happened to the Emergency Broadcast System?  by Cecil Adams, Chicago Reader
 Personal remembrance of the 1971 false alarm with scans of relevant Teletype messages and immediately following UPI story
 EBS Authenticator Word List & more
 An atypical EBS Test from WHEN Syracuse c. 1975, arranged in the style of a radio jingle Real Audio
 Another example of WHEN Syracuse's sung version of the EBS Test announcement, c. 1975
  A test of the EBS from WNBC-TV in New York City, 1980-12-24
 A test of the EBS from WHAS-TV Louisville, KY, c. 1994
 An EBS Test from KGO-TV in San Francisco, c. 1990
 An EBS Test from WPGC in Washington D.C., c. 1981 Windows Media Player is required to hear this file.
 A tornado warning from WNAS Cable-TV in New Albany, IN for Clark County, IN, c. 1990
 North Carolina EBS Training Video, c. 1990
 A history of CONELRAD to EBS to EAS from Filcro Media 1951 - 2008, c 2008 The convergent role of each government agency
 WFIL's pre recorded attack warning message
 WCCO-AM Minneapolis/St. Paul, MN pre recorded attack warning messages from 1961 and aircheck of 1971 EBS mistake

Cold War history of the United States
Disaster preparedness in the United States
Emergency Alert System
Emergency population warning systems
United States civil defense
Warning systems
1997 disestablishments in the United States
American companies established in 1963
Companies disestablished in 1997